|}

The August Stakes is a Listed flat horse race in Great Britain open to horses aged three years or older. It is run at Windsor over a distance of 1 mile 3 furlongs and 99 yards (2,303 metres), and it is scheduled to take place each year in August.

The race was first run as a Listed race in 2004 having previously been run as a lower class race.

Winners

See also
 Horse racing in Great Britain
 List of British flat horse races

References
Racing Post
, 

Flat races in Great Britain
Windsor Racecourse
Open middle distance horse races